Auguste Armand Ghislain Marie Joseph Nompar de Caumont de La Force (18 August 1878, Dieppe – 3 October 1961, Saint-Aubin-de-Locquenay), 12th Duke of La Force, was a French duke and historian. Specialising in the 17th century (he was himself a descendant of the 1000-year-old Caumont de la Force family), his work allowed him to reconstruct events in which his ancestors had taken part. He was elected a member of the Académie française on 19 November 1925.

Works 
 Amours et usages de jadis, Paris, Fayard 1959
 Anne de Caumont-La Force, comtesse de Balbi, Paris, Émile-Paul, 1909
 Chateaubriand au travail, Avignon, Aubanel, 1941
 Claire Marie de Nassau : princesse de Ligne, Bruxelles, [s.n.], 1936
 Comédies sanglantes, drames intimes, Paris, Émile-Paul frères, 1930
 Dames d'autrefois, Paris, Émile-Paul frères, 1933
 De Bayard au Roi Soleil, Paris, La Table ronde 1946
 De Colbert à Marat, Paris, Éditions de la Table ronde 1946
 Deux favorites, Madame de Balbi et Madame de Polastron, Paris, Revue des deux mondes, 1907
 Dix siècles d'histoire de France ; les Caumont la Force, Paris, Fasquelle 1960
 Églises et abbayes de la Sarthe, Paris, J. Delmas et Cie, 1971
 En marge de l'Académie, Paris, Wesmael-Charlier 1962
 En suivant nos pères, Paris, Amiot-Dumont 1952
 Femmes fortes, Paris, Émile-Paul frères 1936
 Histoire du cardinal de Richelieu , 4 tomes, Paris, Plon 1932-1947
 Histoire et portraits, Paris, Editions Emile-Paul frères, 1937
 Journal 1817-1848, Paris, Amiot-Dumont, 1955
 La fin de la douceur de vivre ; souvenirs 1878-1914, Paris, Plon 1961
 La grande mademoiselle, Paris, Flammarion, 1927
 La vie amoureuse de la Grande Mademoiselle, Paris, Flammarion, 1931, 1927
 La vie courante hier et aujourd'hui : une fantaisie de Madame Du Barry, Paris, Bureaux de la Revue de France, 1932
 L'architrésorier Lebrun, gouverneur de la Hollande, 1810-1813, Paris, Plon, 1907
 Lauzun un courtisan du Grand Roi, Paris, Hachette, 1913
 Le beau passé .., Paris, La Table ronde 1946
 Le Duc de La Force, Paris, F. Alcan, 1931
 Le grand Conti, Paris, Émile-Paul frères, 1922. 
 Le Maréchal de La Force, un serviteur de sept rois (1558-1652). [t.1-2], Paris, Émile-Paul frères, 1924-1928
 Les Caumont La Force ; dix siècles d'histoire de France, Paris, Fasquelle 1960
 Les Châteaux de la Sarthe, Paris, Delmas 1960
 Les prisons du Bossu de la Fronde : Armand de Bourbon, prince de Conti, Paris, Revue des deux mondes, 1922
 Les reines de l'émigration, Paris, 1907-1908
 Louis XIV et sa cour, Paris, Productions de Paris, 1959
 Pierre de Nolhac, Paris, Beauchesne, 1938

References

External links 
 Académie française
 Homage to the duke of la Force, discourse on the reception of Joseph Kessel into the Académie française

1878 births
1961 deaths
20th-century French historians
Members of the Académie Française
French male non-fiction writers
Dukes of La Force